Arignar Anna Government Higher Secondary School is a school in Kumbakonam, a town in the Thanjavur district in the Indian state of Tamil Nadu.

Inauguration

This school was inaugurated on 10 November 1919 by Mohamed Habibullah Sahib Bahadur, the then Municipal Councillor of Kumbakonam.

History
Before inauguration the school was functioning in the house of Nataraja Pillai in Kambatta Visvanathar East Street in Kumbakonam. While there was a need for accommodating the school, Gurunatha Pillai who was living very near to the house of Nataraja Pillai, gave way 3 acre of land. From then this was called as Gurunatha Pillai School. Started with 20 students, it has now 600 students and 32 teachers. Wards of daily wage workers and labours studied in this school and performed well. In sports and other fields such as literature, arts such as drama, photography, kabbadi and others the school has a special place in Thanjavur district. Many students participate in those competitions and got good rank.
During the period of Kunchithapatham Chettiar, as Chairman of Kumbakonam Municipality, a new building was opened on 31 October 1955. During 1973 this school became Arignar Anna Municipal High School. In 1977-78 it became Arignar Anna Government Higher Secondary School.

Centenary celebrations
In order to conduct the centenary celebrations, the alumni of the school arranged meetings on 16 June 2019, 14 July 2019  and on 15 March 2020. During the meetings alumni participated in the meetings and among others, the following decisions  were made: 
 To start Smart class, to acquire furniture to the classrooms and to raise the compound wall of the school.
 To award prize to the X and XII students who got good ranks and to reimburse the tuition expenses of the poor students.
 To invite the teachers, including the retired teachers who were behind the success of the students with high percentage of marks.
 To set up a library and donate books.
 To unveil the portrait of Gurunatha Pillai who was instrumental by donating the land to school. 
 To publish a souvenir in commemoration of the Centenary Celebrations.
 To conduct the centenary celebrations in May 2020

Administration
V.Sarathy is the present headmaster of the school.

References

External links
 தனியார் பள்ளிகளை மிஞ்சிய அரசு பள்ளிகள், தினமலர், 11 மே 2011
 கும்பகோண கலையகங்கள், அறிஞர் அண்ணா அரசு மேனிலைப்பள்ளி, கும்பகோணம் டைம்ஸ், 16-31 அக்டோபர் 2013
 தேனி அருகே 1990-ல் பள்ளி படிப்பு முடித்த மாணவர்கள் சந்தித்த நெகிழ்ச்சியான தருணம், கும்பகோணம் அரசு பள்ளி மாணவர்கள் 25 ஆண்டுகளுக்கு பின் சந்திப்பு  சன் நியூஸ், 27 மே 2019
 கும்பகோணம் அரசு மேல்நிலைப்பள்ளியில் பழைய மாணவர்கள் கூடுகை விழா, ரூ. 5 லட்சம் மதிப்பில் மைதானத்தை சீரமைக்க முடிவு, ஸ்கை டிவி, 29 மே 2019
 கும்பகோணத்தில் முன்னாள் மாணவர்கள் சந்திப்பு நிகழ்ச்சி, மாலை மலர், 17 சூன் 2019

Gallery

High schools and secondary schools in Tamil Nadu
Education in Thanjavur district
Educational institutions established in 1919
1919 establishments in India